Craig Patterson (born July 18, 1964) is a former American football defensive end. He played for the Phoenix Cardinals in 1991.

References

1964 births
Living people
American football defensive ends
BYU Cougars football players
Phoenix Cardinals players